Rocky Royer (born June 27, 1958) is an American former professional tennis player.

Biography
Born in Berkeley, California, Royer played collegiate tennis at Rice University for four years. In the early 1980s he competed on the professional tour, winning two Challenger titles. On the Grand Prix circuit his best performances came in 1982 when he was a quarter-finalist at Bahia and in the same year finished runner-up in the doubles at the Quito Open.

Royer now works as a tennis coach in Santa Fe, New Mexico.

Grand Prix career finals

Doubles: 1 (0–1)

Challenger titles

Singles: (2)

References

External links
 
 

1958 births
Living people
American male tennis players
Sportspeople from Berkeley, California
Rice Owls men's tennis players
Tennis people from California